Norman Wilkinson (9 June 1910 – 18 May 1975) was an English footballer who played in the Football League for Stoke City.

Career
Born in Tantobie, County Durham, on 9 June 1910, Wilkinson a collier, began with junior side Tanfield Lea as a centre-half. He then played for West Stanley on the Durham Coalfield where he began to play as a goalkeeper. At the age of twenty he signed for Huddersfield Town, where he played second fiddle to England international Hugh Turner. Bob McGrory wary of Stoke's lack of a decent goalkeeper signed Wilkinson from Huddersfield's reserves for just £100 in July 1935.

At  and just  Wilkinson had a slightly sullen look, with heavy eyebrows and a balding pate and would often walk around his penalty area nervously pulling up his woollen gloves. Although he did not inspire confidence he proved to be a fine shot stopper. His main weakness was a penchant for dropping crosses when under pressure from centre forwards. He remained first choice until World War II when he returned to the north east and guested for Hull City, Sheffield Wednesday, Nottingham Forest and Doncaster Rovers.

On being demobbed Wilkinson had suffered hardship having seen action in France and was in poor physical condition. This led to the Stoke directors attempting to terminate his employment. Wilkinson protested to the FA and the law stated that all returning service men would be entitled to their old job. He won his case and Stoke made him fourth choice 'keeper behind Dennis Herod, Emmanuel Foster and Arthur Jepson. He seemed to be drifting to retirement but due to Herod being injury prone Wilkinson was handed a last chance against Blackpool on the penultimate fixture of the 1948–49 season. He produced a fine display including a wonder save from City legend Stanley Matthews as Stoke won 3–2. His final appearance for Stoke came against his old club Huddersfield Town and Wilkinson kept a clean sheet in a 0–0 draw. He was aged 41 years and 275 days the fourth oldest player to appear for Stoke.

Career statistics

References

External links
 

1910 births
1975 deaths
Military personnel from County Durham
People from Tantobie
Footballers from County Durham
English footballers
Association football goalkeepers
English Football League players
Huddersfield Town A.F.C. players
Stoke City F.C. players
West Stanley F.C. players
Oswestry Town F.C. players
British military personnel of World War II